Herut was the major right-wing party in Israel until its merger into Likud.

Herut (lit. Freedom) may also refer to:

Herut (newspaper), the name of a four different newspapers in Palestine and Israel between 1909 and 1965
Herut, Israel, a moshav in central Israel
Beit Herut, a moshav in central Israel
Herut – The National Movement, a new Herut party created in 1998 by dissenting Likud members